Whittemore Glen State Park is an undeveloped public recreation and wilderness area for hiking and horseback riding covering  mostly within the town of Naugatuck, Connecticut. Sitting outside the southwestern edge of the city of Waterbury, the state park is the eastern terminus of the Larkin State Park Trail. It entered the roles as Connecticut's forty-eighth state park in the 1945–46 edition of the Connecticut Register and Manual. The park is managed by the Connecticut Department of Energy and Environmental Protection.

References

External links
Whittemore Glen State Park Connecticut Department of Energy and Environmental Protection

State parks of Connecticut
Parks in New Haven County, Connecticut
Middlebury, Connecticut
Naugatuck, Connecticut